was a Japanese football player. He played for Japan national team.

National team career
Fukuhara was born in Higashihiroshima on April 2, 1931. On January 5, 1955, when he was a Tokyo University of Education student, he debuted for Japan national team against Burma. He played 2 games for Japan in 1955.

On February 27, 1970, Fukuhara died of stomach cancer at the age of 38.

National team statistics

References

External links
 
 Japan National Football Team Database

1931 births
1970 deaths
University of Tsukuba alumni
Association football people from Hiroshima Prefecture
Japanese footballers
Japan international footballers
Association football forwards
Hibakusha